Prince Franz Seraph von Orsini-Rosenberg (18 October 1761 –  4 August 1832) was born a member of Orsini-Rosenberg family, son of Prince Vinzenz Fererius von Orsini-Rosenberg and Maria Juliana, Countess von Stubenberg. 

He joined the army of Habsburg Austria and fought against the Ottoman Turks, winning a prestigious award for bravery. In the 1790s, he served in the wars against the First French Republic and received promotion to general officer. During the Napoleonic Wars he led a division in 1805 and an army corps in 1809. He became a member of the Hofkriegsrat (Aulic Council) in 1811. He was the Proprietor (Inhaber) of an Austrian light cavalry regiment from 1801 until his death.

Wagram
At the Battle of Wagram, Rosenberg commanded the IV Armeekorps on the left flank.

See also
 List of princes of Austria-Hungary
 Franz Xaver Wolfgang von Orsini-Rosenberg
 Orsini-Rosenberg

Notes

References

Printed materials
 Bowden, Scotty & Tarbox, Charlie. Armies on the Danube 1809. Arlington, Texas: Empire Games Press, 1980.
 Smith, Digby. The Napoleonic Wars Data Book. London: Greenhill, 1998.

External links
 napoleon-series.org Orsini und Rosenberg by Digby Smith, compiled by Leopold Kudrna

1761 births
1832 deaths
18th-century Austrian people
19th-century Austrian people
Austrian soldiers
Austrian generals
Austrian princes
Military leaders of the French Revolutionary Wars
Austrian Empire military leaders of the French Revolutionary Wars
Austrian Empire commanders of the Napoleonic Wars
Knights of the Golden Fleece of Austria
Commanders Cross of the Military Order of Maria Theresa
Nobility from Vienna
Military personnel from Vienna